Hangman's Curse is a 2003 horror suspense film based on the 2001 Christian novel Hangman's Curse, written by Frank Peretti. The film stars David Keith, Mel Harris, Leighton Meester, and Douglas Smith, with a cameo by novelist and Northwest native Peretti. The filming took place in Spokane, Washington, with interior and exterior shots of John R. Rogers High School. Additional exterior shots were filmed at nearby Riverside State Park, as well as Winnipeg, Manitoba, Canada.

Plot 
The film is set at John R. Rogers High School in Spokane, Washington. Ten years prior, student Abel Frye, a victim of bullying, had committed suicide by hanging himself on the school property. Fast-forward to the current day, when several student football players (who are also school bullies) are mysteriously becoming gravely ill. Just before falling into a coma, each victim is heard screaming the spirit's name, Abel Frye. In an effort to get to the bottom of the haunting, the school turns for help to the Veritas Project, a team of highly trained investigators who work undercover to unravel the truth about paranormal activities.  The Veritas Project consists of the members of the Springfield family, including father Nate, mother Sarah, daughter Elisha, and son Elijah.

The high-school students in the film represent various social classes or youth subcultures, including jocks, geeks, and goths. Prominent among the students in the film are members of the goth culture, who worship the ghost of Abel Frye. The goth students are led by Ian Snyder. Unbeknownst to the rest of the school, Norman Bloom, a young geek Elisha befriended, is Frye's nephew. In retaliation for the bullying and mistreatment inflicted on the different students, Bloom exacts revenge on the popular football players.

Bloom's plan includes gaining access to the locker of each targeted bully and placing a deadly male spider, trapped in a straw, inside the locker. Bloom then gives the bully tainted money, upon which he has secretly placed trace amounts of female spider pheromones. When the unsuspecting bully reaches into his locker, the waiting male spider is easily attracted to the pheromones, and then crawls out and bites the student. Among the effects of the toxin, the affected students experience hallucinations, believing that the ghost of Abel Frye is after them.

At one point, Bloom accidentally puts an additional female spider in one of the straws, which results in thousands of deadly spiders overtaking the school. Elisha Springfield, attending the school undercover as a student, eventually figures out the mystery and the diabolical plot designed by Norman Bloom. In fear of being discovered, Bloom attempts to keep his involvement in the haunting hidden by poisoning both himself and Elisha with a spider, hoping that they will both die. When Elijah figures out that Bloom is behind the sinister attacks in the school, he races to find his sister and the Springfield family rush to professor and scientist Dr. Algernon Wheeling, who saves Elisha with an antivenom. In the end, the students at Rogers High School are protected not only from haunting and harm from others, but from the harm brought on by their own hatred and fear, as well.

Cast 

 David Keith as Nate Springfield
 Mel Harris as Sarah Springfield
 Leighton Meester as Elisha Springfield
 Douglas Smith as Elijah Springfield
 Jake Richardson as Ian Snyder
 Bobby Brewer as Leonard Baynes
 Daniel Farber as Norman Bloom
 Edwin Hodge as Blake Hornsby
 Andrea Morris as Crystal Sparks
 William R. Moses as Coach Marquardt
 Margaret Travolta as Debi Wyrthen
 Tom Wright as Dan Carillo
 Frank Peretti as Dr. Algernon Wheeling

Reception 
Hangman's Curse received universally negative reviews. Review aggregation website Rotten Tomatoes gave the film an approval rating of 0% based on 6 reviews, with an average rating of 2.9/10. Some Christian reviewers were more lenient, with Christian Spotlight on Entertainment giving the film three out of five stars.

References

External links 
 
 

2003 films
2003 horror films
Films about evangelicalism
Films directed by Rafal Zielinski
Films set in Washington (state)
Films shot in Washington (state)
Films shot in Winnipeg
Films about spiders
Films set in schools
Films produced by Ralph Winter
American films about revenge
2000s English-language films
2000s American films